The AN/PYQ-10 Simple Key Loader (SKL) is a ruggedized, portable, hand-held fill device, for securely receiving, storing, and transferring data between compatible cryptographic and communications equipment. The SKL was designed and built by Ralph Osterhout and then sold to Sierra Nevada Corporation, with software developed by Science Applications International Corporation (SAIC) under the auspices of the United States Army. It is intended to supplement and eventually replace the AN/CYZ-10 Data Transfer Device (DTD). The PYQ-10 provides all the functions currently resident in the CYZ-10 and incorporates new features that provide streamlined management of COMSEC key, Electronic Protection (EP) data, and Signal Operating Instructions (SOI). Cryptographic functions are performed by an embedded KOV-21 card developed by the National Security Agency (NSA). The AN/PYQ-10 supports both the DS-101 and DS-102 interfaces, as well as the KSD-64 Crypto Ignition Key. The SKL is backward-compatible with existing End Cryptographic Units (ECU) and forward-compatible with future security equipment and systems, including NSA's Key Management Infrastructure.

Between 2005 and 2007, the U.S. Army budget included funds for over 24,000 SKL units. The estimated price for FY07 was $1708 each. When released in May 2005, the price was $1695 each. This price includes the unit and the internal encryptor card.

References

Sierra Nevada SKL spec sheet
2005 US Army Weapons System Handbook

Key management
Encryption device accessories
National Security Agency encryption devices
Military electronics of the United States
Military radio systems of the United States
Military equipment introduced in the 2000s